Alfons Van Uytven (born 11 December 1920) is a Belgian former trade union leader.

Born in Leuven, van Uytven joined the Tobacco Workers' Union (BCVT), and in 1950 was elected as its general secretary.  In 1952, he was additionally elected as general secretary of the International Federation of Tobacco Workers (IFTW).

By 1953, the BCVT had only 3,809 members, and it felt that this was insufficient to continue, so in 1954, it merged into the General Union (AC). Van Uytven became national secretary of the AC, and remained in his IFTW post until 1958, when it merged into the International Union of Food and Drinks Workers' Associations.

In 1976, van Uytven was elected as the general secretary of the General Union, serving until 1980.

References

1920 births
Possibly living people
Belgian trade unionists
People from Leuven